"Lemon" is a song by Japanese singer-songwriter Kenshi Yonezu, released as a single through Sony Music Entertainment Japan on March 14, 2018. It is the theme song for the TV series Unnatural. It has sold more than 500,000 physical copies and 3,000,000 digital copies in Japan.

Background 
Kenshi accepted several interviews about "Lemon", talked about the background of "Lemon" and others. The temporary title was "Memento." He said, "I think it came from somewhere in my memory, but I can't really explain it well either." Even when the day before recording, he was still writing the lyrics, the last two sentences "Like one half of a fruit sliced in two, even now, you are my light" suddenly appears in his brain and he said, "Ahh, so this song really was "Lemon."" He also did the cover illustration himself. He focused on liveliness and freshness of a lemon, giving it an image quite unlike what's typically associated with death. For the song, he wanted to go for a ballad, but a simple ballad is not very interesting for him, and he did not want it to be purely gloomy. As a result, he made a hybrid of sorts, with sad words over a dancing, skipping rhythm. He made this song while on his nationwide tour, during which his grandfather passed away. He agonized over it a lot, so it took even longer to finish than usual.

Music video 
On February 26, 2018, the music video was published on YouTube. It was filmed in a church and has over 700 million views, making it the most-viewed Japanese music video.

Live performances 
On December 31, 2018, Yonezu gave his first performance on television, singing the track on 69th NHK Kōhaku Uta Gassen.

Track listing

Personnel 
Credits adapted from the liner notes.

 Kenshi Yonezu - production, arrangement, vocal, guitar
 Koichiro Muroya - string arrangement, strings
 Yu Suto - bass
 Masaki Huri - drums
 Ichiyo Izawa - piano
 Tatsuya Mochizuki - guitar technician
 Koji Imamura - drum technician
 Akira Miyake - vocal direction
 Masahito Komori - recording, mixing
 Ted Jensen - mastering

Charts

Weekly charts

Year-end charts

Certifications

Accolades

References 

2018 singles
2018 songs
Kenshi Yonezu songs
Billboard Japan Hot 100 number-one singles
Sony Music Entertainment Japan singles
Japanese-language songs
Japanese television drama theme songs
Songs inspired by deaths